Lakhimpur Kheri district is further divided in following sub categories:

 2 Parliamentary Constituencies – Kheri, and Dhaurahra
 8 Assembly Constituencies – Mohammadi, Gola Gokarannath, Kasta, Lakhimpur, Srinagar, Nighasan, Dhaurahara, Palia Kalan.
 7 Tehsils – Lakhimpur, Mohammdi, Gola Gokarannath, Nighasan, Dhaurahra, Palia Kalan, Mitauli
 15 blocks – Lakhimpur, Behjam, Mitauli, Pasgawan, Mohammdi, Gola Gokarannath, Bankeyganj, Bijuwa, Paliya, Nighasan, Ramiyabehar, Issanagar, Dhaurahara, Nakaha, Phoolbehar.
 4 Nagar Palikas – Lakhimpur, Gola Gokarannath, Mohammadi, Palia Kalan
 6 Town Areas  – Kheri, Oel, Mailani, Ba arbar, Singahi, Dhaurahar, Aminnagar, Phardhan

List of Members of Parliament

List of Members of Parliament, Kheri 
 1957: Kushwaqt Rai, Praja Socialist Party
 1962: Balgovind Verma, Indian National Congress
 1967: Balgovind Verma, Indian National Congress
 1971: Balgovind Verma, Indian National Congress
 1984: Usha Verma, Indian National Congress
 1998: Ravi Prakash Verma, Samajwadi Party
 1999: Ravi Prakash Verma, Samajwadi Party
 2004: Ravi Prakash Verma, Samajwadi Party
 2009: Zafar Ali Naqvi, Indian National Congress
2014:Ajay Kumar Mishra, Bhartiya Janta Party

List of Members of Parliament, Dhaurahra 
 2009: Jitin Prasada, Indian National Congress
2014 Rekha Arun Verma Bhartiya Janta Party

List of Members of Legislative Assembly

List of Members of Legislative Assembly, Lakhimpur 
 1969: Pt. Tej Narayan Trivedi, Indian National Congress
 1974: Pt. Tej Narayan Trivedi, Indian National Congress
 1980: Zafar Ali Naqvi, Indian National Congress 
 1989: Zafar Ali Naqvi, Indian National Congress 
 2007: DR. Kaushal Kishore, Samajwadi Party
 2010: Utkarsh Verma, Samajwadi Party
 2012: Utkarsh Verma, Samajwadi Party
2017: Yogesh Verma, BJP

List of Members of Legislative Assembly, Dhaurahara 
 1962: Pt. Tej Narayan Trivedi, Indian National Congress
 1980: Pt. Tej Narayan Trivedi, Independent
 2007: Awasthi Bala Prashad, BSP
 2012: Shamsher Bhadur, BSP
2017, BALA PRASHAD AWASTHI, BJP

List of Members of Legislative Assembly, Gola Gokarannath 
 1997: Arvind Giri, Samajwadi Party
 2002: Arvind Giri, Samajwadi Party
 2007: Arvind Giri, Samajwadi Party
 2012: Vinay Tiwari, Samajwadi Party.
 2017: Arvind Giri, Bharatiya Janata Party
 2022: Arvind Giri, Bhartiya Janata Party

List of Members of Legislative Assembly, Kasta 
 2012: Sunil Kumar Lala,  SP
 2017: Saurab Singh, BJP

List of Members of Legislative Assembly, Mohammdi 
 2012: Awasthi Bala Prasad,  BSP
 2017: Lokendra Pratap Singh BJP

List of Members of Legislative Assembly, Nighasan 
 1952: Thakur Karan Singh, Indian National Congress
 1967: Thakur Karan Singh, Indian National Congress
 1969: Thakur Karan Singh, Indian National Congress
 2014: Krishna Gopal Patel, Samajwadi Party
 2017: Patel ramkumar Verma, Bhartiya janta party
2019(by poll): Shashank Verma, Bhartiya janta party

List of Members of Legislative Assembly, Palia Kalan 
 2012: Harvinder Kumar Sahani,  BSP
 2017: Harvinder Kumar Sahani, Bhartiya Janata Party

List of Members of Legislative Assembly, Srinagar 
 1991: Pt. Tej Narayan Trivedi, Indian National Congress
 2007: R. A. Usmani, Samajwadi Party
 2012: Ramsaran, Samajwadi Party
2017: Manju tyagi, Bhartiya janta Party

List of Members of Legislative Council 
 1958: Pt. Tej Narayan Trivedi, Indian National Congress

List of Presidents Zila Parishad 
 1989–91: Pt. Tej Narayan Trivedi, Indian National Congress

Indian general election, 2009 

Zafar Ali Naqvi of the Indian National Congress party was elected to the Lok Sabha to represent Kheri in the 2009 Parliamentary Elections, beating Iliyas Azmi of the Bahujan Samaj Party by 8,780 votes.

Jitin Prasada, former Union Minister of State for Steel, was elected to represent Dhaurahra, with a winning margin of 184,509 votes. On 28 May 2009, Jitin Prasada was sworn in as Minister of State to the Union Government of India, in the Council of Ministers of Prime Minister Manmohan Singh. Jitin is the Minister of State in the Ministry of Petroleum and Natural Gas.

See also

 Politics of India
 Kheri (Lok Sabha constituency)
 Dhaurahra (Lok Sabha constituency)

References

External links
 Government website
 Lakhimpur - Jagran News
 Previous Lok Sabha Elections Results of Kheri
 G. L. Kanaujia's speech in the Parliament during the 10th Loksabha
 Muzaffar Ali
 Shri Balgovind Verma, Deputy Labour Minister inaugurated the Orientation-cum-training course in Family Welfare Planning in New Delhi on 18 February 1974
 Jitin Prasada: young leader with wide ranging interests

Politics of Lakhimpur Kheri district